Glen Finart is a glacially formed glen on the Cowal peninsula, Argyll and Bute, Scotland.  The glen is within the Argyll Forest Park that is itself within the Loch Lomond and The Trossachs National Park.

Glen Finart runs northwest, from Finart Bay and Ardentinny on the west shore of Loch Long, following the Finart Burn.

Glenfinart House, a Grade B listed house, was destroyed by a fire in the 1960s; the only remaining part of the house is the tower.

References

External links

 / Map of Argyll Forest Park
 Glen Finart on Gaelic place names of Scotland database

Glens of Cowal